Stumme is the name of:
 Georg Stumme (29 July 1886 – 24 October 1942), a German General of World War II
 Absolon Stumme (died 1499), a Late Gothic painter from Northern Germany
 Paul Stumme-Diers (born 1960), a bishop of the Evangelical Lutheran Church in America (ELCA)